Quần Lợi Base Camp (also known as LZ Andy or Rocket City) is a former U.S. Army and Army of the Republic of Vietnam (ARVN) base east of An Lộc, Binh Phuoc Province, in southern Vietnam.

History

1967-71
The base appears to have been initially used to support Operation Junction City in February–May 1967.

The base was established in 1967 on the site of a former French rubber plantation and was located approximately 6 km east of An Lộc in Bình Long Province.

The 1st Brigade, 1st Infantry Division comprising:
1st Battalion, 2nd Infantry Regiment
1st Battalion, 26th Infantry Regiment
1st Battalion, 28th Infantry Regiment
was based at Quần Lợi from March 1968 until August 1969.

The 1st Battalion, 5th Cavalry was based at Quần Lợi in April 1969.

In July 1969 the 11th Armored Cavalry Regiment moved to Quần Lợi and would remain here until September 1969. The regiment would be based here again from December 1969 to July 1970, during which time it participated in the Cambodian Incursion.

In February 1970 the 3rd Brigade, 1st Cavalry Division comprising:
1st Battalion, 5th Cavalry
1st Battalion, 7th Cavalry
2nd Battalion, 7th Cavalry
1st Battalion, 8th Cavalry
1st Battalion, 12th Cavalry

moved to Quần Lợi and would stay here until August 1970. The 3rd Brigade would participate in the Cambodian Inursion.

Other units stationed at Quần Lợi included:
Battery F, 16th Artillery (October 1969-January 1970)
1st Battalion, 21st Artillery (1967-1968)
6th Battalion, 27th Artillery (January 1968-March 1970)
1st Squadron, 9th Cavalry
 Bravo Troop

1972-5
The ARVN took over the base and at the start of the Battle of An Lộc in April 1972 it was defended by a battalion of the 7th Regiment, 5th Division and was also the base for the 9th Regiment. A combined 105mm and 155mm artillery battery was also based at Quần Lợi. On the evening of 7 April elements of the People's Army of Vietnam (PAVN) 9th Division overran Quần Lợi, the 7th Regiment was ordered to destroy their heavy equipment and fall back to An Lộc. Once captured the PAVN used Quần Lợi as a staging base for units coming in from Cambodia to join the siege of An Lộc and key members of COSVN were based there to oversee the battle. 

On 8 August the ARVN 18th Division launched an assault to retake Quần Lợi but were stopped by the PAVN in the base's reinforced concrete bunkers. A further attack was launched on 9 August with limited gains and attacks on the base continued for the next 2 weeks eventually gaining one third of the base. The ARVN finally attacked the PAVN occupied bunkers with TOW missiles and M-202 rockets and this broke the PAVN defense forcing the remaining defenders to flee the base.

Current use
The base is largely overgrown but a small area appears to remain in use by the PAVN.

References

External links
6/27th Artillery homepage
Modern photos and video of the area
Quan Loi base camp photo tour

Installations of the United States Army in South Vietnam
Installations of the Army of the Republic of Vietnam
Military installations closed in the 1970s
Buildings and structures in Bình Phước province